Dottie Pepper (born August 17, 1965) is an American professional golfer and television golf broadcaster. From 1988 to 1995 she competed as Dottie Mochrie, which was her married name before a divorce. She won two major championships and 17 LPGA Tour events in all.

Amateur career
Pepper was born in Saratoga Springs, New York; her father, Don, was a major league baseball player, who appeared on the cover of Sports Illustrated as a "rookie to watch", along with Hall of Famer Johnny Bench, in 1968. Her career began with big amateur victories in her home state of New York. She won the 1981 state amateur and the 1981 and 1983 New York Junior Amateur titles. She was a member of the 1981 Junior World Cup team and low amateur at the 1984 U.S. Women's Open. She attended Furman University, where she earned five collegiate victories and was named All-American three times.

Professional career
She joined the LPGA Tour in 1988 and won 17 official events on the Tour, including two major championships: the 1992 and 1999 Nabisco Dinah Shore. Her 19-under-par finish in the 1999 victory still stands as the lowest score in relation to par in a major championship. She topped the money list in 1992 and finished in the top ten in ten of eleven seasons between 1991 and 2001. Pepper also played for the United States in the Solheim Cup six times.

Due to injury problems, Pepper played only one tournament in 2002. In July 2004 she announced that she would retire at the end of the season. In 2005, she began work as a golf commentator for NBC and The Golf Channel, reporting on both men's and women's events.

During the 2007 Solheim Cup, Pepper caused some stir while working as commentator for the Golf Channel. She called the American team "choking freaking dogs". Pepper thought the network had cut to commercial when the comment was uttered, but it was actually still broadcasting live. Some players and fans were upset by this and Pepper quickly apologized for her "poor choice of words".

In July 2012 Pepper was named by captain Meg Mallon as one of two assistant captains for the U.S. Team at the 2013 Solheim Cup.

Pepper retired from commentating in December 2012, tired of the traveling and wanting to spend more time promoting junior golf as a PGA of America board member. In May 2013, she signed a contract with ESPN to return to commentating on a limited basis, working mainly major tournaments on the PGA, LPGA and Champions Tours.  In October 2015, Pepper was signed to a contract with CBS, replacing David Feherty who had left the network to work for NBC and to continue his Feherty series on the Golf Channel. She took up Feherty's role as on-course reporter as well as doing occasional tower announcing.

Personal life
Pepper resides in Saratoga Springs, New York with her third husband, golf writer and historian David Normoyle. They were married in May 2010.

Professional wins (25)

LPGA Tour wins (17)

LPGA Tour playoff record (3–5)

LPGA majors are shown in bold.

Futures Tour wins (1)
1985 Albany-Colonie Chamber Open (as an amateur)

LPGA of Japan Tour wins (1)
1989 Karuizawa 72 Tokyu Ladies Open

Other wins (6)
1992 JCPenney Classic (with Dan Forsman)
1995 JCPenney/LPGA Skins Game
1996 Diners Club Matches (with Juli Inkster)
1997 Diners Club Matches (with Juli Inkster)
1999 Diners Club Matches (with Juli Inkster)
2000 Hyundai Team Matches (with Juli Inkster)

Major championships

Wins (2)

1 Defeated Inkster with par on first extra hole.

Results timeline

^ The Women's British Open replaced the du Maurier Classic as an LPGA major in 2001.

CUT = missed the half-way cut
WD = withdrew 
"T" = tied

Summary
Starts – 65
Wins – 2
2nd-place finishes – 3
3rd-place finishes – 3
Top 3 finishes – 8
Top 5 finishes – 12
Top 10 finishes – 17
Top 25 finishes – 42
Missed cuts – 6
Most consecutive cuts made – 38
Longest streak of top-10s – 5

Team appearances
Amateur
Curtis Cup (representing the United States): 1986

Professional
Solheim Cup (representing the United States): 1990 (winners), 1992, 1994 (winners), 1996 (winners), 1998 (winners), 2000

Solheim Cup record

See also
List of golfers with most LPGA Tour wins

References

External links

American female golfers
Furman Paladins women's golfers
LPGA Tour golfers
Winners of LPGA major golf championships
Solheim Cup competitors for the United States
Golf writers and broadcasters
Golfers from New York (state)
Golfers from Orlando, Florida
Women sports announcers
Sportspeople from Saratoga Springs, New York
1965 births
Living people